Andrzej Leszek Bargiel (born April 18, 1988 in Rabka, Poland) is a Polish ski mountaineer, backcountry skier, mountain runner and climber. Raised in Łętownia, he is a three-time Polish ski mountaineering champion and held third place in the overall World Cup. He is the current record holder in taking the least amount of time to achieve the Snow Leopard award. He is also the current record holder in the Elbrus Race. Since 2013, he has been running his original HIC SUNT LEONES (“here are lions” in Latin) project, the goal of which are speedy, oxygenless ascents and ski descents from the highest mountain peaks on Earth. These included Shishapangma in 2013, Manaslu in 2014, Broad Peak in 2015, and K2 in 2018. He lives in Zakopane, Poland.

Achievements 
 2009, 8th, 2009 European Championship of Ski Mountaineering relay race (together with Szymon Zachwieja, Jacek Żebracki and Mariusz Wargocki)
 2010:
 9th, Pierra Menta (together with Peter Svätojánsky)
 10th ("ISMF men" ranking), Patrouille des Glaciers together with Jacek Żylka-Żebracki and Mariusz Wargocki
 1st - record on Elbrus Race (Extreme route, 3:23:37)
 2013, October 2 – he is the first Pole to have made a ski descent of Shishapangma (central summit)
2014, September 25 – he set a record time climbing from base camp to the summit of Manaslu in 14 hours 5 minutes. He also set a record time for base-peak-base at 21 hours 14 minutes (on skis).
2015, July 25 – he was the first person to climb and ski down Broad Peak
 2016: Winning the Snow Leopard award in record time - 29 days 17 hours 5 minutes from the start of the ABC July 15
 Lenin Peak - July 16 (ascent from Advanced BC at the height of 4400 meters to the summit in 13 hours 30 minutes and exit from the summit on skis to ABC in 2 hours).
 Peak Korzhenevskaya - July 25 (ascent from Moskvina BC at the height of 4350 meters to the summit in 8 hours 40 minutes; exit from the summit on skis for the snow line and the descent to the base camp).
 Ismoil Somoni Peak - August 2 (ascent from Moskvina BC at the height of 4350 meters to the summit in 14 hours 25 minutes; exit from the summit on skis for the snow line and the descent to the base camp).
 Khan Tengri - August 10 (ascent from the South Inylchek BC at an altitude of 4070 meters to the summit in 8 hours 17 minutes; descent on skis from an altitude of about 6300 m).
 Jengish Chokusu - August 14, 12:35 local time, descent on skis.
 2017, May 21 - Skiing Mallory's Couloir of the north face Aiguille du Midi

 2018, July 22 - First man in history to ski from the summit of K2 to base camp without removing skis.
 2019, September 30 – due to safety issues he stopped the Everest Ski Challenge expedition.

Selected Prizes

In February 2019, Andrzej Bargiel was named National Geographic Adventurer of the Year.

External links 

 Andrzej Bargiel's Personal Web Page
 Andrzej Bargiel's YouTube Channel

References 

1988 births
Living people
Polish male ski mountaineers
Polish mountain climbers
Place of birth missing (living people)
People from Sucha County